Double-mindedness is a concept used in the philosophy and theology of the Danish philosopher Søren Kierkegaard (1813–1855) as insincerity, egoism, or fear of punishment. The term was used in the Bible in the Epistle of James. Kierkegaard developed his own systematic way to try to detect double-mindedness in himself.

In Kierkegaard
Kierkegaard asked himself:  Do I want to be a Christian or not? Do I want to be a preacher or not? Do I want to be a teacher or not? Do I want to get married or not?  All these questions have to do with the future. Many were willing to give him advice but he felt the decision was ultimately his own. Individuals fear making a decision because of external opposition but this need not stop one from making a decision so long as one has the capacity to learn through experience whether the decision was a good decision for one's self.

David F. Swenson was born in Sweden October 29, 1876 and his family moved to America in 1882. He became a professor of philosophy at the University of Minnesota in 1917 and was very interested in the writings of Søren Kierkegaard. He ended up translating many of his books into English. At the time, America's human population was increasing and the same question asked in the Psalms was asked by people like David Swenson: "How shall we sing the Lord's song in a strange land?" (Psalms 137:4). Below are several quotes from Kierkegaard's book, Upbuilding Discourses in Various Spirits, published on March 13, 1847 where he tried to answer that question.

There were brazen teachers of brazenness who thought that justice was to do wrong on a large scale and then to be able to make it appear that one nevertheless willed the good. Thus they had, so they thought, double advantage, the wretched advantage of being able to do wrong, of being able to have their will, of letting their passions rage, and the hypocritical advantage of seeming to be good. But in ancient times there was also a simple wise man whose simplicity became a trap for the quibbling of the brazen; he taught that in order to be really sure that it was the good one willed, one should avoid even appearing to be good-presumably lest the reward should be tempting. Upbuilding Discourses in Various Spirits, Hong p. 37 What is your frame of mind toward others? Are you in harmony with everyone-by willing one thing? Or are you divisively in a faction, or are you at loggerheads with everyone and everyone with you? Do you want for everyone what you want for yourself, or do you want the highest for yourself, for yourself and for yours, or that you and yours shall be highest? Do you do unto others what you want others to do to you-by willing one thing? This willing is the eternal order that orders everything, that brings you in harmony with the dead and with the people you never saw, with strange people whose language and customs you do not know, with all the people on the whole earth, who are blood relatives and eternally related to divinity by eternity's task to will one thing. Do you want a different law for yourself and for yours than for others; do you want to have your comfort in something different from that in which every human being unconditionally can and will be comforted? If a king and a beggar and one of your peers came to you at the same time, would you in their presence dare with bold confidence to assert what you want in the world, with bold confidence to assert wherein you seek your comfort, positive that his Royal Majesty would not disdain you even though you are an inferior, positive that the beggar would not go away disheartened as if he could not have the same comfort, positive that your peer would rejoice in your bold confidence! Alas, there is something in the world called an alliance; it is a dangerous thing, because all alliances are divisiveness. It is divisive when the alliance excludes the commoner, and when it excludes the nobleman, and when it excludes the government worker, and when it excludes the king, and when it excludes the beggar, and when it excludes the wise, and when it excludes the simple soul-because all alliances are divisiveness in opposition to the universally human. But to will one thing, to will the good in truth, to will as a single individual to be allied with God-something unconditionally everyone can do-that is harmony. Upbuilding Discourses in Various Spirits, Hong p. 144

The first type of double-mindedness, that of willing for the sake of reward or out of fear of punishment, is akin to the distinction between intrinsic and extrinsic values. The second type of double-mindedness, that of willing only to a certain degree, is akin to distraction or half-hearted willing. Each type of double-mindedness is a human weakness and an obstacle to an individual pursuit of greatness and strength towards willing and reaching the Good. To counter double-mindedness, Kierkegaard argues that discipline and clarity of the self is essential and necessary to overcome double-mindedness. Double-mindedness isn't something evil but not recognizing that you, yourself, are a self-contradiction and double-minded is self-deceit.

Kierkegaard constantly writes about "willing the Good" but he does not go so far as to tell the single individual, "my reader", what the Good is, because, as far as Kierkegaard was concerned, the Good is something that each individual finds by living life and believing that God creates purposefully. He asks the individual to consider whether or not his or her life is a contradiction. Does the individual see the Good and the reward or the Good and the punishment? Only the individual involved in the task of living knows and when it is found you might not be able to explain to anyone why you think it is a Good.

Expert knowers

Is there a way for an individual to choose a career and have certainty that the career will offer the same rewards others have been given? Is there a marriage which will offer, with certainty, happy love between the beloved? Both Kierkegaard and Nietzsche were interested in these questions. Are there certain gifted individuals who know if you should marry or become a minister or a journalist or a philologist or is it something you should perhaps speak to God about and yourself? Nietzsche thinks the ethicist can help the person find the good. Kierkegaard said, "the ethicist can tell a person it's her duty to marry but the ethicist can in no way tell her whom she should marry." Kierkegaard questioned the supposition that anyone had a "duty" to marry. He was against people becoming "soul experts" and "expert knowers of love". But can an individual be an expert knower of him or her self? Nietzsche says no, 

Kierkegaard made an analogy to this idea of taking knowledge and putting it into practice in his 1845 book, Three Discourses on Imagined Occasions (Hong 1993),  also translated as Thoughts on Crucial Situations in Human Life (Swenson 1941). He questions if knowledge has any importance at all without making use of it in daily life: 

"Let us imagine a pilot, and assume that he had passed every examination with distinction, but that he had not as yet been at sea. Imagine him in a storm; he knows everything he ought to do, but he has not known before how terror grips the seafarer when the stars are lost in the blackness of the night; he has not known the sense of impotence that comes when the pilot sees the wheel in his hand become a plaything for the waves; he has not known how the blood rushes to the head when one tries to make calculations at such a moment; in short, he has had no conception of the change that takes place in the knower when he has to apply his knowledge. What fair weather is to the sailor, that for the ordinary person is to live at the same pace with others and with the race, but the moment of decision, the dangerous moment of reflection when he takes himself out of the environment to be alone before God, to become a sinner, this is the stillness that upsets the customary order like a storm at sea. He knew all this, knew what would happen to him, but he did not know how anxiety would seize him, as he felt himself deserted in the manifold wherein he has his soul; he did not know how the heart beats when help from others, and the guidance from others, and the standards and the distractions afforded by others, vanish in the stillness; he did not know the trembling of the soul, when it is too late to shout for human aid, since no one can hear him: in short, he had no idea of how knowledge is changed when he needs to apply it."

"Is this perhaps your case, my reader? I do not judge, I merely ask you. Alas, while the number of those who know so much increases more and more, the really able men become fewer and fewer! But it was such a man that you once wished to be. You have surely not forgotten what we said about sincerity: that a man must retain a clear recollection of what he once wished to be; and now you are to prove your sincerity before God in the confession of sins. What was it you once wished? You wished to strive after the highest ideals, to apprehend the truth and dwell in it; you would spare neither time nor effort; you would renounce everything, including every illusion. If you did attain the highest goal, you wanted to make sure of being clearly conscious of what you had formerly meant in striving to attain it. If this was ever so little, you would rather be faithful over a little than unfaithful over much. If this was your sole thought, and you became the poorest of all in the midst of the rich who know everything, you would rather still be as true as gold-and this is in the power of everyone who wills it, for gold is for the rich, but a golden loyalty is possible also for the poor. And he who was faithful over a little, faithful in the day of trial, when the reckoning is made in the stillness where no reward beckons, but only the guilt becomes clear, faithful in this sincerity which acknowledges everything, even the imperfection of the sincerity, faithful in the love that repents, the humble love whose demand is for self-accusation: he shall also be made ruler over more. Was not this what you wished? For we are agreed that in relation to the essential, knowing it is essentially identical with the ability to do it."
 Soren Kierkegaard, Thoughts on Crucial Situation in Human Life, 1845, Swenson translation 1941 pp. 35–37 

Kierkegaard wrote much about the validity of marriage in all his books with this same idea in mind. Again, you can know everything in an objective way about marriage but its only when you actually decide to get married that you stand alone with your spouse and live the married life. He says, "It is told that Socrates is supposed to have answered someone who asked him about marriage: Marry or do not marry-you will regret both. Socrates was an ironist who presumably concealed his wisdom and truth ironically lest it become local gossip, but he was not a mocker. The questioner's stupidity lies precisely in asking a third person for something one can never learn from a third person." The Good is always a good gift from God: 

He put it this way in Judge for Yourselves!: 

Friedrich Nietzsche questioned why individuals choose a career in his 1872 book, We Philologists. 

Can the effectiveness of a minister, journalist, professor, be quantified? How does anyone really know when something said had a great effect for good or for evil? Kierkegaard believed in the power of the single individual but didn't leave out others since no individual is stronger than himself. All individuals "create in the innermost being temptations of glory and temptations of fear and temptations of despondency, of pride and of defiance and of sensuality greater than those we meet in the external world, and this is the very reason we struggle with ourselves." The struggle is a good struggle as long as the "task" is maintained in its proper place. Not to know what a minister is, but to become and be a minister, not to know what a journalist is, but to become and be a journalist, not to know what a professor is, but to become and be a professor, etc. He didn't want to intrude in another's growth in the direction of religion because, Christianly speaking, "The difficulty is not to understand what Christianity is but to become and be a Christian." The task isn't to know what the good is or the beauty or the true but to become the good, the beauty and the true God meant you to become. He wrote this in 1846:

Pride and cowardliness
Søren Kierkegaard wrote his Four Upbuilding Discourses on August 31, 1844. One of them was named Against Cowardliness and he used the Bible verse from 2 Timothy 1.17 "For God did not give us a spirit of timidity but a spirit of power and love and self-control." He says, "we creep before we learn to walk, and to want to fly is always precarious." Many people, Christians included, make great resolutions and then just imagine that they will come about by the help of God, but "striving" is needed if one wants to try to do a "good" thing, called "the highest good" by philosophers. Kierkegaard asks about the lowest thing a person can do, isn't that a highest good for that single individual?

Christianity presents a goal which Kierkegaard calls an eternal happiness and Christ called "Paradise". Jesus said, "Verily I say to you, today you will be with me in Paradise." or it might be "Verily I say to you today, you will be with me in Paradise." (Luke 23.43) to the thief on the cross. The goal was very close for the thief but might not be so close for the single individual who wants to be a Christian. Kierkegaard asks why the Christian should not set a few intermediate goals that can be accomplished before the eternal happiness arrives. One does not have to start with saving the world. Kierkegaard suggested exploring the relationship between pride and cowardliness to see if one of these two passions is keeping you from reaching intermediate goals. He has advice for goal setters. Stop talking and start! Don't worry so much about the outcome. Set a goal for yourself and try to reach it. It's alright if you fail because you can start again immediately. If you need help, ask someone. But this goal should be something in particular, something concrete, so that your passions can be aroused. If Christianity is the task then it's a task that lasts a lifetime.

References

Sources 
 The Bible: The Book of James
 D. Anthony Storm's Commentary on Upbuilding Discourses In Various Spirits
Purity of Heart Is to Will One Thing, by Søren Kierkegaard, March 13, 1847
Anthony Storm's Commentary on Eighteen Upbuilding Discourses
Wikiquote Soren Kierkegaard, Four Upbuilding Discourses, 1844

Søren Kierkegaard
Ethics
Mental states
Philosophy of religion